Tinosu is a commune in Prahova County, Muntenia, Romania. It is composed of three villages: Predești, Pisculești, and Tinosu.

The ruins of a Dacian fortified town is located near the villages of Tinosu and Pisculești.

References

Communes in Prahova County
Localities in Muntenia